Rasesa is a village in Kgatleng District of Botswana. The village is located 10 km west of Mochudi, along the Gaborone–Mahalapye road. The population was 2,461 in 2001 census.

References

Kgatleng District
Villages in Botswana